Charles Keane may refer to:

Charles Keane of the Keane Baronets
Charles Keane, High Sheriff of Sligo
Charles Keane (actor, 1922–1983), in Seven Guns to Mesa (1958)

See also
Charles Kean, English actor (1811–1868)
Charles Keene (disambiguation)